Durjan Singha Dev was the fifty-third king of the Mallabhum. He ruled from 1682 to 1702.

History

Personal life
Durjan Singha Dev, the son of Bir Singha Dev, was the opposite of his father. He was not at all cruel; on the contrary, he had a very gentle, polite character. He was logical, kind hearted and also pious. He established Madan Mohan temple. During his period several Portuguese, French, British traders came to this place. He was on the one hand a Vaishnava devotee and on the other hand a great warrior.

Mallabhum Temples

Madanmohan Temple

Madanmohan Temple built by King Durjan Singha Deva in 1694 the temple in the ekaratna style, a square flat-roofed building with carved cornices, surmounted by a pinnacle.

References

Sources
 

Malla rulers
Kings of Mallabhum
17th-century Indian monarchs
Mallabhum
Mallabhum temples